Lucius Faenius Rufus, an eques Romanus, was praefectus annonae from AD 55 to 62. Tacitus reports that (unlike most holders of that office) he did not profit from it. With Tigellinus, he succeeded Sextus Afranius Burrus as praetorian prefect in AD 62. Rufus had a close association with Agrippina the Younger. In 65, however, he was executed for his part as a member of the Pisonian conspiracy against the Emperor Nero.

Sources
Tacitus, Annales, 14.51 and 15.50

References

   

1st-century Romans
65 deaths
Praetorian prefects
Praefecti annonae
Members of the Pisonian conspiracy
Year of birth unknown
Executed ancient Roman people
People executed by the Roman Empire
Rufus, Faenius